Callista, also spelled Calista, Callistee, Kallista, Kalista and Kallistee, comes from the Greek for "most beautiful (feminine)" (καλλίστη – kallístē).

Callista may refer to:

Nature
 Callista (bivalve), a genus of bivalves
 Callista Lour., a synonym of Dendrobium, an orchid genus
 Callista D.Don, a synonym of Erica, a heath or heather genus

Entertainment
 A SWAT Kats: The Radical Squadron character, the presumed ancestor of Deputy Mayor Callie Briggs
 Callista (novel), 1855 novel by John Henry Newman
 Callista Ming, a character in the Star Wars Expanded Universe
 A main character from the video game The Last Story

People
 Callista Balko, American athlete
 Callista Chimombo, Malawian politician
 Calista Flockhart, American actress
 Callista Gingrich, wife of Newt Gingrich
 Callista Roy, American nursing theorist

Science
 204 Kallisto, an S-type asteroid which was discovered in 1879
 Callisto (moon), one of the moons of Jupiter, discovered in 1610

Places
 Kallista, Victoria, a town in Australia
 Kalista, a village in south-western Bulgaria

Other
 Panther Kallista, a retro-style automobile manufactured by Panther Westwinds from 1982 to 1993
 Calista (steamboat), a small steamboat of the Puget Sound Mosquito Fleet
 RV Callista Southampton University research vessel

See also
 Calista (disambiguation)
 Callisto (disambiguation)
 Calisto (disambiguation)
 Callistus (disambiguation)